Amélie is a French feminine given name, ultimately derived from the Germanic name Amalia.

The variant form Amelie is used outside the Francophone world, sometimes by French people.

People with the given name 
 Amélie Beaury-Saurel (1849–1924), French painter
 Amelie Beese (1886–1925), German aviator
 Amélie Cocheteux (born 1978), former French professional tennis player
 Amélie Coquet (born 1984), French football player
 Amélie d'Orléans (1865–1951), the eldest daughter of Prince Philippe, Count of Paris
 Amelie Delagrange (1982–2004), French murder victim
 Amélie Diéterle (1871–1941), French actress and opera singer
 Amélie Gex (1835–1883), Savoyard poet
 Amélie Goudjo (born 1980), French handball player
 Amélie Goulet-Nadon (born 1983), Canadian short track speed skater
 Amélie Jakobovits (1928–2010), British charity patron
 Amelie Kober (born 1987), German snowboarder
 Amélie Kuhrt (born 1944), historian and specialist in the history of the ancient Near East
 Amélie Lacoste (born 1988), Canadian figure skater
 Amélie Le Fur (born 1988), French Paralympian athlete
 Amélie of Leuchtenberg (1812–1873), Empress of Brazil as the wife of Emperor Pedro I
 Amélie Linz (1824–1904), German author
 Amélie Lundahl (1850–1914), Finnish painter 
 Amélie Mauresmo (born 1979), retired professional tennis player
 Amélie Nothomb (born 1967), Belgian writer
 Amélie Perrin (born 1980), French female hammer thrower 
 Amélie Plume (born 1943), Swiss writer
 Amelie Posse (1884–1957), Swedish writer
 Amélie Rives Troubetzkoy (1863–1945), American novelist and poet
 Amélie Sarn (born 1970), French author, comic book writer and translator
 Amelie von Strussenfelt (1803–1847), Swedish novelist
 Amelie Veiller Van Norman (1844–1920), French-born American educator

Fictional characters
 Amélie Lacroix, better known as Widowmaker, a character in the video game Overwatch
 Amelie Planchard, a character in the anime series Strike Witches
 Amélie Poulain, protagonist of the film Amélie
 Lady Amelie Graham de Vanily, a character in the cartoon Miraculous: Tales of Ladybug & Cat Noir

See also
 Amélie, a French film
 Amelia (given name)
 Amalie (given name)

French feminine given names